Scott Harrington (born March 10, 1993) is a Canadian professional ice hockey defenceman for the  Anaheim Ducks of the National Hockey League (NHL). Harrington was selected by the Pittsburgh Penguins in the second round, 54th overall, of the 2011 NHL Entry Draft.

Early life
Harrington was born on March 10, 1993, in Kingston, Ontario, to parents Pat and Cindy. His younger sister Holly also played ice hockey growing up.

Playing career

Pittsburgh Penguins
Having been drafted by the Pittsburgh Penguins in the second round, 54th overall, of the 2011 NHL Entry Draft, Harrington made his NHL debut on December 18, 2014, in a 1–0 Pittsburgh overtime win against the Colorado Avalanche.

Toronto Maple Leafs
On July 1, 2015, Harrington was traded to the Toronto Maple Leafs in a multi-player blockbuster deal for Phil Kessel. Following the trade, Harrington impressed at the Maple Leafs' training camp, making the NHL roster for the opening night of the 2015–16 season. However, injuries plagued Harrington's season, and he would only play 32 games collectively for the Maple Leafs and their American Hockey League (AHL) affiliate, the Toronto Marlies.

Columbus Blue Jackets
On June 25, 2016, shortly after the conclusion of the 2016 NHL Entry Draft, Harrington was traded to the Columbus Blue Jackets (alongside a conditional fifth-round draft pick) in exchange for forward Kerby Rychel. The condition of the fifth-round pick would have been satisfied if Harrington was placed on waivers and claimed during the 2016–17 season, which did not occur.

During the 2017–18 season, Harrington earned consistent playing time after Ryan Murray was injured, resulting in his playing 24 consecutive games. As a result, he also set a career-high with two goals and three assists for five points while also averaging 13:24 per game. Prior to the start of the 2018–19 season, Harrington suffered an upper body injury in a preseason game on September 28 and missed the Blue Jackets first two regular season games. Upon returning to the lineup, Harrington set new career highs in assists and points with two goals and 15 assists for 17 points in a career-high 73 games. He also helped the Blue Jackets advance past the first round of the postseason for the first time in franchise history by recording four assists through 10 playoffs games.

Harrington was a consistent healthy scratch during the 2019–20 season, sitting out 22 of 30 games by December. However, as a result of injuries to the Blue Jackets lineup, he suited up for 39 of the team's 70 regular-season games. Harrington finished the regular season with one goal and seven assists for eight points.

San Jose Sharks
After six seasons within the Blue Jackets organization, Harrington left as a free agent and went un-signed over the summer. On September 9, 2022, Harrington agreed to join the training camp of the San Jose Sharks on a professional tryout. During the pre-season, Harrington successfully completed his tryout in earning a one-year, two-way contract with the Sharks on September 30.

Anaheim Ducks
On February 26, 2023, Harrington was traded to the New Jersey Devils in a multi-player trade, which involved Timo Meier. However, Harrington was waived by New Jersey one day later, and was subsequently claimed by the Anaheim Ducks on February 28.

International play

Harrington was named as one of Canada's alternate captains for the 2013 World Junior Championships in Ufa, Russia.

Career statistics

Regular season and playoffs

International

Awards and honours

References

External links

1993 births
Living people
Anaheim Ducks players
Canadian ice hockey defencemen
Cleveland Monsters players
Columbus Blue Jackets players
Ice hockey people from Ontario
London Knights players
Pittsburgh Penguins draft picks
Pittsburgh Penguins players
San Jose Barracuda players
San Jose Sharks players
Sportspeople from Kingston, Ontario
Toronto Maple Leafs players
Toronto Marlies players
Wilkes-Barre/Scranton Penguins players